Lysipatha is a genus of moths in the family Gelechiidae.

Species
 Lysipatha cyanoschista Meyrick, 1926
 Lysipatha diaxantha Meyrick, 1932

References

Gnorimoschemini